Frederick Sherriff (born 10 July 1943) is a former Australian tennis player who reached the first and second round in 1962 Australian Championships in men's singles he was defeated by Rod Laver and he played at the 1964 US Championships with William Higgins in the 64th round.

Personal life 
He has a wife and son called Justin, who is also a tennis player.

References

External links 
 

1943 births
Living people
Australian male tennis players
Tennis people from New South Wales
20th-century Australian people